Gagata dolichonema is a species of sisorid catfish native to China, Myanmar, India, and Thailand. This species grows to a length of  SL.

References

External links

Sisoridae
Fish of Myanmar
Freshwater fish of China
Freshwater fish of India
Fish of Thailand
Fish described in 1996